Gwalia is an archaic Welsh name for Wales. It derives from the Medieval Latin Wallia, which in turn is a Latinisation of the English 'Wales'. (For the Germanic etymology of this name see Walha.) Although never as widely used as Cymru, Gwalia was once popular as a poetic name for the country, akin to Albion.

The name originated in the Middle Ages and there are several instances of it in Late Medieval Welsh poetry. Possibly the best-known is in 'Yr Awdl Fraith', a long poem or awdl attributed to Taliesin, and one of the most popular of the period. It imagines gwyllt Walia (Wild Gwalia) rising up against the Saxon invaders of Britain.

In the 19th century, at the height of Romanticism, the name Gwalia once again became popular among local writers. It has now largely fallen out of use due to its Victorian associations.

See also
Cambria
Etymology of Vlach
Walha

History of Wales